The Howard Bison football team represents Howard University in college football at the NCAA Division I Football Championship Subdivision (FCS) level as a member of the Mid-Eastern Athletic Conference (MEAC).

History

First FBS Victory
On September 2, 2017, Howard football reached a milestone by defeating their first FBS opponent in program history.  The Bison defeated the UNLV Rebels 43–40 in Sam Boyd Stadium. As of September 2017, Howard's victory against UNLV is the biggest point-spread upset in college football history, with UNLV being a 45.5 point favorite.

Classifications
1937–1972: NCAA College Division
1973–1977: NCAA Division II
1978–present: NCAA Division I–AA/FCS

Conference memberships
1893–1911: Independent
1912–1970: Central Intercollegiate Athletic Association
1971–present: Mid-Eastern Athletic Conference

Championships

National championships

Conference championships

See Note A

Division I-AA/FCS Playoffs results
The Bison have appeared in the I-AA/FCS playoffs one time with an overall record of 0–1.

College Football Hall of Fame members
Willie Jeffries
Doug Porter

Alumni in the NFL
Over 20 Howard alumni have played in the NFL, including:
Ron Bartell
Antoine Bethea
Marques Douglas
Omar Evans
Derrick Faison
Rupert Grant
Gary Harrell
John Javis
Billy Jenkins
Jimmie Johnson
Troy Kyles
Greg Pope
Herman Redden
Robert Sowell
Leonard Stephens
Brandon Torrey
Sean Vanhorse
Jay Walker
Tim Watson
David Westbrook
Jose White
Tracy White
Gary Willingham
Marques Ogden
Steve Wilson

Rivals
Howard's top rival is Hampton University.  The two schools call their intense rivalry Battle of "The Real HU".

Howard also has a strong rivalry with Morgan State University in the Howard–Morgan State football rivalry.

Another of Howard's historic rivals is Morehouse College, more popularly known as the Howard/"Spel-House" rivalry due to Morehouse's close association with the all-women's HBCU Spelman College. This rivalry is not often played because Morehouse is a Division II athletic program, while Howard is Division I.

A new rivalry has developed between Howard and Georgetown University.  The two schools compete in a contest called The DC Cup.  Currently, Georgetown holds a 2–1 series lead in the contest.

See also
List of black college football classics

Notes
A.Howard went 9–1 and won the MEAC championship in 1987, however a later investigation by Howard University and MEAC found that coach Willie Jeffries used ineligible players. All wins from the 1987 season were vacated and the MEAC Championship was transferred to Delaware State, who had been the runner-up.
B.Rayford Petty was an assistant coach under Gary Harrell in 2011 and 2012. Gary Harrell stepped away from coaching Howard for the 2013 season for personal reasons, but remained under contract as the head coach to return in 2014. Rayford Petty was promoted to head coach for the 2013 season only, in a temporary role.

References

External links
 

 
American football teams established in 1893
1893 establishments in Washington, D.C.